David Nathan is a former member of the Michigan House of Representatives first elected in 2008. He represented part of Detroit.

Early life 
Nathan was born in Detroit, Michigan.

Career 
Nathan owns a real estate business.

On November 4, 2008, Nathan won the election and became a Democratic member of Michigan House of Representatives for District 11. Nathan defeated Leonard A. Mier Jr. with 96.93% of the votes. On November 2, 2010, as an incumbent, Nathan won the election and continued serving District 11. Nathan defeated Leonard Mier with 97.09% of the votes. On November 6, 2012, Nathan won the election and became a Democratic member of Michigan House of Representatives for District 8. Nathan defeated David Porter with 96.92% of the votes.

Personal life 
Nathan's wife is Leslie Nathan. They have four children. Nathan and his family live in Detroit, Michigan.

References

External links 
 David Nathan at ballotpedia.org

Living people
21st-century American politicians
Democratic Party members of the Michigan House of Representatives
Year of birth missing (living people)